Douglas Croft (born Douglas Malcolm Wheatcroft, August 12, 1926 – October 24, 1963) was an American child actor and a soldier who is best remembered for being the first person to portray the DC Comics character Robin, the Boy Wonder, as well as his secret identity Dick Grayson, in the 1943 serial Batman when he was 16 years old.

Early life
Croft was born Douglas Malcolm Wheatcroft on August 12, 1926, in Seattle, Washington, in the United States. His mother, Beatrice Hayden, married the silent film actor Stanhope Nelson Wheatcroft. They divorced in 1922, and his mother relocated to San Francisco. His parents' divorce was a bitter one, and about the time he was born in August 1926, Stanhope Wheatcroft attempted to have Beatrice declared dead so that he could stop paying alimony.

Acting career
Croft was living with his mother in Los Angeles, California, in 1941. Fascinated by movie stars, a talent agent spotted him loitering near a studio and signed him up. About September 1941, he began using the stage name "Douglas Croft". He also shaved several years off his age, claiming in July 1941 and again in March 1942 that he was 11 years old. A December 1941 newspaper report listed his age as 12, when he was by then actually 15.

His first role was as the pet pupil of teacher Claudette Colbert in Remember The Day. His second role was a small part in the 1942 film Kings Row, with his first major part and notable performance coming the same year in Not A Ladies Man.

His breakout role was that of the young George M. Cohan in 1942's Oscar-winning Yankee Doodle Dandy. The year 1942 also saw Croft in a substantial role as the young Lou Gehrig in The Pride of the Yankees and as Raymond in George Washington Slept Here. then as Skip in Harrigan's Kid  and as Davey in Presenting Lily Mars.

Croft was the first actor to play the comic book character Dick Grayson/Robin in a motion picture, doing so in the 1943 15-chapter movie serial Batman. As of 2013, Croft remains the youngest person (aged 16) to portray Robin, who at that time was depicted in comic books as being a young teenager. The producers made one change to the character, and that was to give Croft a wig of untamed curly hair.

Later life
Croft served in the United States armed forces during World War II.

In February 1947, he was critically injured in a motorcycle accident which killed 19-year-old driver John J. Masterson.

His final motion picture role, a bit part in 1947's Killer McCoy, was filmed in June or July 1947.

Death
Douglas Croft died on October 24, 1963 in Los Angeles of acute alcohol intoxication and liver disease, aged 37. He was buried at Fort Rosecrans National Cemetery near San Diego, California.

Filmography

References

External links

 Memorial

1926 births
1963 deaths
American male film actors
American male child actors
20th-century American male actors
Burials at Fort Rosecrans National Cemetery
Male film serial actors
Male actors from Seattle
American military personnel of World War II
Alcohol-related deaths in California
Deaths from liver disease